was a rural district located in central Aichi Prefecture, Japan. As a result of various consolidations and mergers of municipalities, the district was incorporated into the five cities of Kariya, Anjō, Takahama, Chiryū and Hekinan in 2005.

History
Hekikai is one of the ancient counties of western Mikawa Province and is mentioned in Nara period records, under the alternative pronunciation of the kanji in its name (Aomi), of which the only remain is Aomi-cho, a section of Takahama. In the Edo period, under the Tokugawa shogunate, most of the district was either part of Kariya Domain, a feudal domain, or tenryō territory administered directly by the shogunate, and was of the richest agricultural areas of Mikawa. After the Meiji Restoration, the area was merged into Aichi Prefecture.

In the cadastral reforms of the early Meiji period, on October 1, 1889, Hekikai District was divided into three towns (Chiryū, Kariya and Ohama) and 56 villages (62 villages by 1891 due to reorganization). Kitaohama village became Shinkawa Town on August 1, 1892, followed by Yasaku village on February 19, 1893 and Takahama on July 9, 1900. In a round of consolidation in May 1906, the town of Anjō was created, and the remaining number of villages was reduced from 61 to 9. Tanao was elevated to town status on January 1, 1924, leaving the district with eight towns and eight villages.

After World War II, Ohama Shinkawa and Tanao towns merged to form the city of Hekinan on April 5, 1948. Kariya was elevated to city status on April 1, 1950 and Anjō to city status on May 3, 1952. On April 1, 1955, Yasaku town was annexed by Okazaki city. In 1956, Takaoka and Sakurai villages were both elevated to town status, followed by Mutsumi in 1958 and Kamigō in 1961. Mutsumi was annexed by Okazaki on October 15, 1962, and Kamigō by Toyota on March 1, 1964. Toyota also annexed Takaoka on September 1, 1965. On April 1, 1967 Sakurai was annexed by Anjō. Finally, on December 21, 1970 the towns of Chiryū and Takahama were both elevated to city status, and Hekikai District was abolished as an administrative unit.

External links
　Counties of Japan

Former districts of Aichi Prefecture